Toh Guo'An (born September 5, 1982) is a Singaporean football player who is currently a goalkeeper for the S.League club Singapore Armed Forces Football Club.

Club career
Toh started his football career as a 19-year-old for Tampines Rovers Football Club the Prime League team. He won the Prime League Players of the year award that year. He eventually progressed up the ranks to the S-League squad the following year.

In 2001, Toh helped the Tampines Rovers's Prime League Team to finish 3rd in the Prime League. He also made his S-League debut in the same year.

In Toh 1st full season in the S-League in 2002, he won his first Singapore Cup medal with Tampines Rovers Football Club.

In 2003, Toh become a member of the pioneer squad of the Young Lions (Singapore football team).

In 2005, Toh moved to SAFFC as he was serving his National Service. He was registered as a Prime League player. He made his SAFFC debut on the 31st of August against Woodlands Wellington FC.

Toh helped SAFFC to win the 2006, 2007, 2008 and recently the 2009 S-League Championship and the 2007, 2008 Singapore Cup, his 4th S-League and 3rd Singapore Cup winners medal in 7 full season as a professional.

Toh made his debut in Asia's premier club competition, AFC Champions League when he came on as a substitute against Suwon Samsung Bluewings on 19 May 2009.

Honours

Club

Tampines Rovers Football Club
Singapore Cup: 2002

Singapore Armed Forces
S.League: 2006,2007,2008,2009
Singapore Cup: 2007,2008

External links
sleague.com
data2.7m.cn

Living people
1982 births
Singaporean sportspeople of Chinese descent
Singaporean footballers
Warriors FC players
Geylang International FC players
Tampines Rovers FC players
Young Lions FC players
Association football goalkeepers
Singapore Premier League players